Cathedral Church of the Redemption, also known as the Viceroy Church, is a church in New Delhi, India, that was built between 1927 and 1931. The church is located east of Parliament House and Rashtrapati Bhavan, formerly Viceroy’s House, which was used by then British Viceroy.  The Cathedral Church of the  Redemption India, is a part of the Delhi diocese of the Church of North India (CNI)

The Church derives its name from Palladio's Church of Il Redentore in Venice.

Architecture
The building was designed by Henry Medd. The cathedral was built in such a manner that even in the extreme summers it remains cool and serene. The church has beautifully curved high arches and delicate domes, which won the heart of  the then Viceroy Lord Irwin.

Archives
The church since its inception on 18 January 1936, has been particular to maintain all its records and minutes of its meetings, and is the proud owner of a 1733 Cambridge Press published Bible, bound in red leather. Its first service was held on 3 December 1922 at 8 am. and the earliest recorded wedding solemnized, was that of Adelbert Vere and Mina Monica (a widow), by Chaplain T.H. Dixon on 20 October 1926. On 4 March 1923, Chaplain T.H. Dixon officiated at the first baptism of baby David Herbert. Sixty-four year old Mary Digoll's funeral service was the first conducted by A.N. Till, the Chaplain of Delhi, on 27 November 1925.

Education and Health
The Cathedral Church of the Redemption serves the community through its activities in education and health. Music of the church is still on its organ built in 1931. Notable organists who played on the organ since its inception, were Sergeant Desmond Pye, Arthur Mahinder who played for thirty-two years and Bobby Chandy.

Among many prestigious institutions under the diocese are:

 St. Stephen's College, Delhi
 St. Thomas School
 Queen Mary's School
 The Victoria School
 St Stephen's Hospital, Delhi and the LPCEF

Churches in Delhi

 St. Stephen's Church, Delhi
 Central Baptist Church (Delhi)
 Sacred Heart Cathedral, New Delhi
 St. James' Church, Delhi

References

Church of North India cathedrals
Churches in New Delhi
Cathedrals in New Delhi
Baroque architecture in India
Tourist attractions in Delhi
1931 establishments in India
Churches completed in 1931
Renaissance Revival architecture
20th-century churches in India